Lucky Chance is a 1994 Telugu-language comedy film, produced by C. Sarath Babu under the Sri Madhav Arts banner and directed by Siva Nageswara Rao. It stars Rajendra Prasad, Kanchan  and music composed by Sri. The film was inspired by the 1954 classic movie Chakrapani, which itself was based on Malladi Venkata Krishna Murthy's novel Vitamin M. The film was recorded as a Hit at the box office.

Plot 
The film begins with two close friends Dharma Rao (Satyanarayana) and Veerabhadram (M. Balayya) going with an amusing challenge, whose children are going to grant them a grandson. So accordingly, they pact through their family lawyer Nayudamma (Kota Srinivasa Rao) by depositing 2 lakhs in the bank. Affirming, one stands first and gains the amount with the interest.

Years roll by, the elders expire, the amount multiplies into Rs.50 lakhs, and except Nayudamma nobody knows the code. Here, Veerabhadram has three sons, Seshagiri (Giri Babu), Anjaneyulu (Tanikella Bharani), and Bose (Rajendra Prasad). Dharma Rao has two sons, Sivaram (A. V. S), Rajababu (Chinna), and a daughter Bhanu (Kanchan) respectively. Both families still maintain cordial relations. Since Nayudamma is a swindler he negotiates with Bose a loaf, for a 50% share. Actually, Bose loves Bhanu, but she is hostile as she aspires to settle in the States. At present, Bose reveals the secret, convinces her, and couples up with her. Meanwhile, Nayudamma's son-in-law Dakshina Murthy (Brahmanandam) also learns the fact that he divulges Raja Babu. As follows, everyone is cognizant of it. Thereafter, all the ladies conceive at once and one ploy on each other. At a stage, Bhanu is poisoned and hospitalized at death's door when she realizes the virtue of Bose. Ultimately, Bose is blessed with a baby boy and both the families are united. Just now, repelled Nayudamma and Dakshina Murthy's fuse and seizes the newborn baby when Bose rescues him with the help of his family. Finally, Bose wins 50 lakhs but perceiving the fruitlessness of treacherous money he shares the amount with the family which culminates happily.

Cast 

Rajendra Prasad as Bose
Kanchan as Bhanu
Satyanarayana as Dharma Rao
Kota Srinivasa Rao as Nayudamma
Brahmanandam as Dakshina Murthy
Giri Babu as Seshagiri
M. Balaiah as Veerabhadram
A.V.S. as Sivaram
Dharmavarapu Subramanyam as Manager
Tanikella Bharani as Anjaneyulu
Chinna as Rajababu
Jenny as Lalitha's father
Kavitha as Bharathi
Bangalore Padma as Doctor
Shilpa as Lalitha
Sandhya as Uma
Sameera as Dhanalakshmi
Y. Vijaya as Sivaram's wife

Soundtrack 

Music composed by Sri. Lyrics were written by Sirivennela Sitarama Sastry. Music released on Balaji Audio Company.

Other 
 VCDs and DVDs on – VOLGA Videos, Hyderabad

References 

1994 films
1990s Telugu-language films
Indian comedy films
Films based on Indian novels
Films directed by Siva Nageswara Rao